Turbo-Union Limited is a joint venture between three European aero-engine manufacturers, FiatAvio (now Avio), MTU Aero Engines and Rolls-Royce.

Products
The company's only product is the RB199, a three-spool turbofan developed specifically for the Panavia Tornado.

Structure
The ownership of the company similarly split into-
 40% Rolls-Royce
 40% MTU Aero Engines
 20% Avio S.p.A. (formerly Fiat Aviazione)

It had an office on Arabellastraße in Munich near both NAMMA and Panavia, but the head office was initially at Filton. It was known as Rolls-Royce Turbo-Union Ltd. Turbo-Union was a fully integrated and collaborative European Company, whose formal language was English, by kind and charitable agreement of the Governments concerned. The organisation of the company was of FG (Functional Group) kind - for example, FG4 was Concept Design Engineering, FG6 was Customer Support Engineering and Provisioning, and so on. Each FG was chaired by a European person included people from all three companies as required. The FG also had subgroups - for example, FG4-4 was Development, FG6-2 was FTC (Flight Test Centre) support.

The company is now based at the home of Rolls-Royce in Derby, but also has an office at the Panavia head office in Germany at Hallbergmoos.

Production sites
Turbo Union as a whole designed and produced the engine, albeit the GA (General Arrangement) drawing was assembled at Bristol (Filton) from all three partners' inputs. Over 2000 engines were built up to and including the 1990s, from components sourced in all three countries in approximate proportion to their Governmental support. The RAF had engines assembled and supported from Bristol, the German Air Force and Navy from Munich, and the Italian Air Force from Turin (Torino).

History
When it was formed in October 1969 it was claimed to be the largest aero-engine consortium in the world. The RB199 would be Europe's biggest ever military engine programme, and was based at Filton.

Development of the Rolls-Royce RB199 started in September 1969, prior to the formation of Turbo-Union.

The first RB199 engine ran in September 1971, with the first flight in a Tornado in August 1974. The engines are all FADEC controlled with slightly different engine versions for each Tornado variant. The French took no part in the European project, not least because it was a direct competitor of the Snecma M53 engine. However, later in the 1980s, the French joined MTU Turbomeca Rolls-Royce to build the MTR MTR390 helicopter engine.

In 1983, a Swiss organisation, the Arbeitsgruppe für Luft und Raumfahrt (ALR) based in Zurich, proposed an aircraft called the Piranha 6 powered by a single RB199.

The first prototype Eurofighter planes used the RB199 engine, until in June 1995 when the first EJ200-engined plane took off from Turin. Its predecessor, the British Aerospace EAP, also used the engines.

Management
The first Chairman was Hugh Conway, the Managing Director of the Bristol (Filton) plant of Rolls-Royce. Marshal of the Royal Air Force Denis Spotswood was Chairman from 1975-80.

For many years, the designer of the Pegasus engine, Gordon Lewis, was Managing Director. Previous to him was Martin Steinberger of Motoren und Turbinen-Union (MTU - based in Munich). Karlheinz Koch was MD until 2008.

References

See also
 EuroJet Turbo GmbH
 Aerospace industry in the United Kingdom
 Rolls-Royce Turbomeca Limited - set up in 1965 between Rolls-Royce and France's Turbomeca to make the Rolls-Royce Turbomeca Adour for the SEPECAT Jaguar

Aircraft engine manufacturers of the United Kingdom
Aerospace companies of Europe
Multinational aircraft engine manufacturers
Companies based in Derby
Companies based in Bristol
Gas turbine manufacturers
Manufacturing companies established in 1969
1969 establishments in England